Beacon is a city located in Dutchess County, New York, United States. The 2020 census placed the city total population at 13,769. Beacon is part of the Poughkeepsie–Newburgh–Middletown, New York Metropolitan Statistical Area as well as the larger New York–Newark–Bridgeport, New York–New Jersey–Connecticut–Pennsylvania Combined Statistical Area.

Beacon was so named to commemorate the historic beacon fires that blazed forth from the summit of the Fishkill Mountains to alert the Continental Army of British troop movements. Originally an industrial city along the Hudson, Beacon experienced a revival beginning in 2003 with the arrival of Dia Beacon, one of the largest modern art museums in the United States. Recent growth has generated debates on development and zoning issues.

The area known as Beacon was settled by Europeans as the villages of Matteawan and Fishkill Landing in 1709. They were among the first colonial communities in the county.

History

In 1683 Francis Rombout and Gulian Verplanck, merchant-fur traders from New York City, purchased the land that would come to include the City of Beacon from the Wappinger tribe. The sale was sanctioned by James II of England in 1685 in the Rombout Patent. Rombout died in 1691, leaving his share to his daughter, Catheryna Brett. The Rombout Patent was partitioned in 1706, and Brett received and maintained approximately 28,000 acres along the Vis Kill.

Brett sold some of her land to other settlers, often retaining the right to build a flour mill on the property. During the first third of the nineteenth century, Dutchess County ranked first among New York State counties in wheat production. Mills on Brett's property attracted farmers from both sides of the river. In 1748 Brett and a group of other settlers agreed to build the Frankfort Store House near the water at the "Lower Landing" north of Dennings Point. This store marked the beginning of river freighting in the area, and Fishkill Landing developed into a river port. As early as 1780 two dozen vessels operated out of Fishkill Landing. John Peter DeWint, owner of 2,000 acres at Fishkill Landing, helped further raise its status as a port by building the Long Dock in 1815. The village of Fishkill Landing was incorporated in 1864.

Matteawan was situated on the Fishkill Creek about a mile and a half east of Fishkill Landing, and a like distance above the mouth of the creek, whose hydraulic properties contributed to its development as a manufacturing center. It lay at the foot of the Fishkill Mountains, and was a station on both the Newburgh, Dutchess & Connecticut, and the New York & New England Railroads, and was connected with the Fishkill Landing by stage, and rail.

The city served a variety of roles during the Revolutionary War. It manufactured war supplies, and served as a fort and signaling point. The city's name came from signal fires lit atop nearby Mount Beacon.

During the 1800s, the city became a factory town and was known as "The Hat Making Capital of the US" with nearly 50 hat factories operating at one time. The Matteawan Manufacturing Company was the first in the area devoted to hat production, employing 500 workers. Many others followed, including Dutchess Hat Works, which produced 450 dozen hats daily by 1900 owned its own showroom in Manhattan.

Beacon incorporated as a city in 1913, combining the villages of Fishkill Landing and Matteawan as well as a small portion of the hamlet of Glenham from the town of Fishkill.

During the 1960s, urban renewal led to the destruction of some significant historic buildings. In 1975, the Dutchess Ski area, which had been a large tourist attraction, was closed. Also in the 1970s, a decline in the economy shuttered most of Beacon's factories. This resulted in a severe and ongoing economic downturn that lasted from about 1970 to the late 1990s, during which almost 80 percent of the city's commercial business spaces and factories were vacant. Starting in the late 1990s, and with the opening of Dia Beacon, one of the world's largest contemporary art museums, in 2003, Beacon began an artistic and commercial rebirth. New development continues to enlarge the city. Currently, the two largest planned projects are a waterfront hotel and conference center, and "The Rivers and Estuaries Center" on Dennings Point.

Beginning on February 24, 2010, a massive snowstorm affected the city and surroundings. On February 25, Mayor Steve Gold enacted a State Of Emergency, due to total snow accumulations in excess of three feet. The city was without electricity and natural gas services for over two days.

Beacon is home to one of a handful of operating "dummy lights" in the United States, located at the intersection of Main and East Main Streets. It is a traffic signal on a pedestal which sits in the middle of an intersection, dating back to the 1920s.  Two others are located in New York, in Canajoharie and Croton-on-Hudson.

Geography
The total area is 2.25% water.

Located on the eastern shore of the Hudson River, Beacon is noted for its proximity to numerous historic sites and large cities. It is located minutes away from Bannerman's Castle and West Point. Beacon also sits with the famous Mount Beacon as its backdrop and the Hudson River as its front door. The city also is located across the river from its larger sister city, Newburgh. Beacon is just 20 minutes south of the Hudson Valley Region capital city, Poughkeepsie. Danbury, Connecticut, lies approximately 30 miles to the east, while New York City is 55 miles to the south.

Neighborhoods
The city includes the following neighborhoods:

Main Neighborhoods
 River Side Section
 Mountain Side Section

Secondary Neighborhoods
 North Tree Streets
 South Tree Streets
 Business District (Main Street Area)—revitalized over the last decade with artists' studios, shops and restaurants
 "Davies" or "The Apartments" (Section of City with a Concentrated Area of Public Housing on South Ave)
 "Forrestal Heights"—This also is partially populated by elderly fixed income persons in the one high rise building in the complex and welfare recipients in the two-story apartments in the surrounding neighborhood.
 "The Derk" (Neighborhood east of Fishkill Creek along East Main; generally, the environs of Beacon Fire Station 1.)

Historic neighborhoods
Byrnsville, or Tioronda, was a hamlet near the mouth of the Fishkill creek, about a mile south of Fishkill Landing, and contained the Tioronda Hat Works. In 1880 it had a population of two hundred and seventeen. The Hat Works occupied the site of an old cotton-mill at this place which failed before 1850. A grist and saw-mill were subsequently built on the site but torn down by Lewis Tompkins in 1878 when the Hat Works were erected. A little below these works is the former site of the Madam Brett grist-mill, for which this has been mistaken.

Groveville derives its name from the extensive oak grove which formerly occupied the site. There was a grist mill at Groveville from a very early day, owned about 1820 by Samuel Upton, a Quaker. who acquired it from Abraham Dubois. Upton also erected on the opposite side of the race a stone building which he used as a fulling mill. Sometime after 1840, the property, was sold it to the Glenham Co., who converted it to a woolen mill, and did carding, spinning and weaving.

The first several blocks of Main Street east of its junction with South Avenue constitutes the Lower Main Street Historic District and features many small businesses located in vintage Italianate-style buildings.

Historic places

Madam Brett Homestead, 50 Van Nydeck Avenue: the oldest building in Dutchess County, and is on the National Register of Historic Places.
Bogardus-DeWindt House is located on Tompkins Avenue, a short distance west of NY 9D, in Beacon, New York, United States. It typifies the houses built in the region between 1750 and 1830. It was included on the National Register of Historic Places on April 19, 1993.
Denning's Point is a peninsula that extends into the Hudson River. It was known as "DePeyster's Point" until Adjutant-General William Denning purchased the land in 1785. The land has been the site of a brickyard and other industries. It is now the location of The Beacon Institute for Rivers and Estuaries. There is evidence that Alexander Hamilton lived on Denning's Point during the Revolutionary War and started crafting The Federalist Papers while living at this location.
Eustatia is a brick cottage in the Victorian Gothic style overlooking the Hudson River on Monell Place. It was built in 1867 to designs by Frederick Clarke Withers for his friend John Monell. Monell had recently married Caroline DeWindt Downing, widow of the influential Newburgh architect Andrew Jackson Downing, with whom Withers had worked. They built the house on property deeded to them by her father, John DeWindt. Its original form and appearance have remained largely intact since its construction. In 1979 it was added to the National Register of Historic Places.
The Howland Cultural Center, also known as Howland Library, is the former public library building, located on Main Street. It was designed in 1872 by Richard Morris Hunt, brother-in-law of Joseph Howland. He was one of a committee of ten local benefactors who had joined to establish a library for their city, and commissioned Hunt for the job. When the library opened, its 2,200-volume collection was available only to subscribers. Later the library opened to the general public, but by 1976 the collection needed more space and so the library moved down Main Street. The old library building is now in the hands of a private non-profit organization, the Howland Cultural Center, which presents art exhibitions and other cultural activities. It was added to the National Register of Historic Places on May 5, 1973.
Reformed Church of Beacon, originally the Reformed Dutch Church of Fishkill Landing, is a congregation of the Reformed Church in America.  The oldest church in Beacon, the congregation was established in 1813. It overlooks the Hudson River from the top of a bluff. The church and its cemetery were added to the National Register of Historic Places in 1988.
United States Post Office is located at 369 Main Street, Beacon NY. It is a stone structure in the Dutch Colonial Revival architectural style built in the mid-1930s. In 1988 it was listed on the National Register of Historic Places along with many other older post offices in the state. The building's fieldstone exterior is a distinctive feature of New Deal era design.

Demographics

The 2010 United States census listed the population at 15,541. 

The census of 2000 placed the city's population at 13,808 people. The census also showed that the city has 5,091 households and 3,360 families residing in the city. The population density was 2,891.6 inhabitants per square mile (1,115.3/km), based on the census population of 13,808. There were 5,406 housing units at an average density of 1,132.1 per square mile (436.7/km). The racial makeup of the city was 9,440 or 68.37% White and 4,368 or 31.63% Minority. The minority population was dominated by African Americans at 2,713 residents or 19.65%, then followed by Hispanic or Latino which make up 2,334 residents or 16.90% of the city. Smaller minority groups include 956 residents or 6.92% from other races, 181 residents or 1.31% Asian, 43 residents or 0.31% Native American, and 0.00% Pacific Islander. Also, the city includes 475 residents or 3.44% identifying themselves as two or more races.

Based on census data showing 5,091 households, 34.7% had children under the age of 18 living with them, 44.6% were married couples living together, 16.9% had a female householder with no husband present, and 34.0% were non-families. 28.6% of all households were made up of individuals, and 10.4% had someone living alone who was 65 years of age or older. The average household size was 2.61 and the average family size was 3.23.

Of the city's total population, 27.1% were under the age of 18, 7.1% were between 18 and 24, 31.9% were between 25 and 44, 21.7% were between 45 and 64, and 12.2% were 65 years of age or older. The median age was 36 years. For every 100 females, there were 90.3 males. For every 100 females age 18 and over, there were 86.3 males.

The median income for a household in the city was $45,236, and the median income for a family was $53,811. Males had a median income of $40,949 versus $29,154 for females. The per capita income for the city was $20,654. 1,465 residents or 11% of the population and 310 families or 9.1% of the total number of families were living below the poverty line. Of the total population, 834 residents or 11% of those under the age of 18, and 99 residents or 8.6% of those 65 and older, were living below the poverty line. The city's housing stock was currently composed of 10% subsidized housing, of which about 400 units were state and federal housing projects.

Government

Beacon is governed via the mayor-council system. The mayor is elected in a citywide vote. The city council consists of six members. Two are elected at-large. The other four are elected from one of four wards.

Emergency response

The City of Beacon participates in the Dutchess County Department of Emergency Response. All calls for police are routed to the City of Beacon Police who dispatch their vehicles to the call. All calls for fire or medical assistance are dispatched by the County Department of Emergency Response. The City of Beacon Fire Department is a combination Paid and Volunteer Department that provides fire suppression, rescue, and emergency medical first response for the city. Beacon Volunteer Ambulance Corps is a combination paid and volunteer agency that provides Basic Life Support and Mobile Life Support Services provide Advanced Life Support medical care within the city.

Media
Beacon is served by two weekly newspapers: The Highlands Current, founded in 2010 and published on Friday, and the Beacon Free Press, published on Wednesdays. A daily paper, The Beacon Evening News, was published in the city from 1961 to 1990.

Attractions

Museums and institutes
Dia Beacon: contemporary arts museum.
The Beacon Institute of Rivers and Estuaries: a major river and estuary research institute.

Parks and recreation
Bannerman Castle Trust: in connection with the Beacon Historical Society. 
Forrestal Park: connected to Forrestal Elementary on Liberty Street this large playground with a basketball court is a longtime favorite with locals. (in city)
Green Street Park: neighborhood park located in the Mountain Side Section of the city (in city)
Hammond Field: neighborhood park located in the River Side Section of the City that is primarily used for the city school district functions. Is the home of the "Beacon Bulldogs" Track and Football venues. (in city)
Hudson Highlands State Park: state park located behind and just south of the city. A very large state park that covers Mount Beacon. (1–3 minutes east and south of city)
Memorial Park: located in the center of the city and serves as the city's "Central Park". It is the city's primary park and many civic events are hosted there. (in city)
Mt. Beacon Park: the hiking trails in and around the Mt. Beacon Incline Railway 
The Pete and Toshi Seeger Riverfront Park: The City's riverfront park, which is located on a peninsula jutting out into the Hudson River. A very active park that hosts numerous events. It was renamed in 2014. (in city)
River Pool at Beacon: a project for cleaning up the Hudson River and allowing a safe place to swim.
South Ave Park: housing project park for the Forrestal Heights Houses. Primarily used for the Beacon Hoops program, a city youth basketball program. (in city)
University Settlement Park: owned by the city and operated by the Department of Parks and Recreation. It includes a theater space that is available for rental. It is also home to The Beacon Pool, and an outdoor pool that is 140 feet by 50 feet and is open to the community in the summer. (in city)

Clubs
 Beacon Sloop Club: started in 1978 to promote recreation, sound ecological practices, and environmental awareness of the Hudson River. The BSC offers free rides to the public on the Sloop Woody Guthrie, teaches seamanship to its volunteers, and maintains the harbor.
 Town Crier Cafe: music venue

Transportation

Beacon's most major route is Interstate 84 (I-84), which passes through the city's north side, providing a connection that is minutes to the Taconic State Parkway, New York State Thruway, and Stewart International Airport. The city also has the Newburgh-Beacon Bridge which carries the Interstate Highway over the Hudson River.

New York State Route 9D (NY 9D) serves as the city's north–south arterial. It starts at the city's north side and wraps around the city to its south side. The city also has NY 52 Business, which begins in the city's west side at NY 9D and runs across the middle of the city to I-84 east of the city limits.

Commuter service to New York City is available via the Beacon Train Station, served by Metro-North Railroad.

From 1902 to 1978, the Mount Beacon Incline Railway was one of the steepest incline railways in existence (a 74% grade). It took an estimated 3.5 million people up to the  summit of Mount Beacon. Fire and vandalism destroyed the incline railway. There is now a movement to restore it.

In the nearby Town of Wappinger, the Dutchess County Airport services local commuter flights. The nearest major airport to Beacon is Stewart International Airport about 10 minutes away, in Newburgh.

Dutchess County Public Transit operates public bus service in and near Beacon on weekdays, Saturdays, and runs with limited schedules on Sunday. One line (Route A) travels from downtown Beacon northeast on NY 52 to Fishkill and north on U.S. Route 9 (US 9) through Wappingers Falls to South Hills Mall, Poughkeepsie Galleria and downtown Poughkeepsie. Another line (Route B) travels from Beacon north to Poughkeepsie along NY 9D and US 9. A third line (Route F) travels northeast from Beacon through Fishkill to Hopewell Junction.

Beacon also has its own shuttle service, which runs on Sundays.

Sports

Amateur sports
An amateur rugby club, The Hudson Valley Rebels, are composed of a Women's Rugby team (formed in 2005), and a Men's team (started in 2002).
A disc golf ("frisbee golf") course was constructed in the woods and fields of the University Settlement camp in 2011. This 18-hole course, "Beacon Glades", is free and open to the public. Stroke-play tournaments are occasionally held.

Beacon High School has a Fitness Center and 25-yard swimming pool run by the Athletic Department that is open to the public for membership.

Professional sports
Hudson Valley Renegades: Class A Minor League Baseball Team for the New York Yankees. The team plays home games in Dutchess Stadium located in neighboring Fishkill (3–5 minutes north of city). The team, formerly a member of the New York–Penn League, joined the new High-A East in 2021.
Hudson Valley Hawks: semi-professional basketball of the National Professional Basketball League. Played their games at Beacon High School.
The Hudson Valley Bears were one of four founding members of the Eastern Professional Hockey League (2008–09). They played their home games at the Mid-Hudson Civic Center in nearby Poughkeepsie.
The Hudson Valley Highlanders of the North American Football League played their home games at Dietz Stadium in nearby Kingston.

Notable people

Natives
Nick Acquaviva, American composer, pianist, and band leader; brother of Tony Acquaviva.
Tony Acquaviva, was an American composer, conductor, string instrumentalist, and the founder of the New York Pops Symphony Orchestra. A graduate of the United States Military Academy at West Point, he married singer Joni James in 1956 at St. Patrick's Cathedral in New York City. His father, Mike Acquaviva, ran a barber shop on Main Street for many years.
Melio Bettina, boxer, World Light Heavyweight Champion in 1939. A small street in the city's center is named in his honor.
Wallace E. Conkling (1896–1979), seventh bishop of the Episcopal Diocese of Chicago, was born and raised in Matteawan (now part of Beacon).
James Forrestal, Secretary of the Navy from 1944–1947 and Secretary of Defense, 1947–1949. One of the city's four elementary schools and one of its federal housing projects are named in his honor.
Elijah Hughes, professional basketball player
Paul Lavalle, conductor, composer, arranger and performer. Notable for his contribution to numerous radio shows throughout the 1940s, he was selected to be the conductor for the famous Band of America in 1948. In the 1960s, he was instrumental in forming what became the 100-member McDonald's All-American High School Band which participated in the Macy's Thanksgiving Day Parade and Tournament of Roses Parade.
Robert Montgomery, actor and director who served as head of the Screen Actors Guild in 1935 and 1946, born in Fishkill Landing (now Beacon). He was also a Lieutenant Commander in the US Navy during World War II and father of actress Elizabeth Montgomery (star of Bewitched).
Digger Phelps, head basketball coach at Notre Dame (1972–91), won more games (393) than any coach in school history; later a television commentator. For a time early in his career, he coached junior varsity basketball in Beacon. A small street off west Main Street is named in his honor.
Ann E. Rondeau, retired US Navy Vice Admiral, served as the president, National Defense University (NDU), which is the premier center for Joint Professional Military Education and is under the direction of the Chairman, Joint Chiefs of Staff.
Lenny Torres, baseball player

Residents
Joseph Bertolozzi, composer, musician, and creator of the Bridge Music and Tower Music projects, is a resident of Beacon.
Mel Birnkrant, toy designer and collector known for his extensive collection of Mickey Mouse and other toys of pre-World War II comics characters. He was the creator of numerous toys such as Weenies, the Outer Space Men, the Magic Diaper Babies, Baby Face and the Trash Bag Bunch. He was also the Creative Director of Colorforms for over two decades.
Frances Hodgson Burnett, English author, spent time in then-Fishkill Landing while recovering from a mental condition.
Richard Butler, painter, musician, lead singer of The Psychedelic Furs.
Ron English, an American contemporary artist who explores brand imagery, street art and advertising.
William Few, a Founding Father of the United States
Joseph Howland, civil war general and philanthropist. He is the namesake of the Howland Cultural Center and the city's public library.
Bruce Molsky, old-time fiddler, guitarist, and singer
David Rees, cartoonist and humorist
Henry Winthrop Sargent, horticulturist and landscape gardener.
Pete Seeger, folk singer and activist
Toshi Seeger, environmental activist and filmmaker
Frances Ford Seymour, mother of actors Jane Fonda and Peter Fonda, was a patient at Craig House in Beacon when she committed suicide in 1950.
Clifford Shull, Nobel Prize-winning physicist
Doug and Mike Starn, American artists
Elmer Steele, Major League Baseball pitcher who played for Boston, Pittsburgh, and Brooklyn from 1907 to 1911

In popular culture
Major motion pictures:
Drowning Mona: The movie's production studio, Code Entertainment, claims that the movie was based and partially filmed in the city during its 1999 filming. The movie was based in the city and scenes were shot in the city.
Super Troopers: Film was based in the city and the "Town Cop" scenes as well as most of the inside scenes were filmed in the city in 1999. Started out as an underground film and then became a very popular "teen comedy" movie.
Nobody's Fool: Filmed largely in the home of the Schneider family. Many other scenes were filmed in the city in 1994, most notably three or four scenes that showed Main Street's "Main St., USA" appeal. The movie featured an all-star cast with Paul Newman and Bruce Willis. Jessica Tandy's last film.
A Quiet Place (2018): A scene from the movie was filmed at Beacon Natural Market.

Television:
People of Earth: The TBS show starring Wyatt Cenac is largely set in Beacon.
Severance: Portions of this television series, set in the fictional town of Kier, were filmed in Beacon.

See also

Beacon City Schools
Beacon Correctional Facility
Sloop Woody Guthrie
St. Joachim and St. John the Evangelist's Church (Beacon, New York)

Notes and references

Notes

References
City of Beacon. Canajoharie, New York: Credits. Retrieved September 30, 2008.
Croton-on-Hudson Historical Society. Canajoharie, New York: Credits. Retrieved September 30, 2008.
Villages of Canajoharie & Palatine Bridge. Canajoharie, New York: Credits. Retrieved September 30, 2008.

External links

The Highlands Current (local newspaper)

 
Cities in New York (state)
New York (state) populated places on the Hudson River
Poughkeepsie–Newburgh–Middletown metropolitan area
Cities in the New York metropolitan area
Cities in Dutchess County, New York